Riverside on Main St. in New England, North Dakota, was built in 1887. It has also been known as McKenzie Hotel. It was listed on the National Register of Historic Places in 1983.

The original part of the hotel was one of New England's first buildings, built in 1887. It was later expanded by William C. McKenzie.

References

Hotel buildings on the National Register of Historic Places in North Dakota
Hotel buildings completed in 1887
National Register of Historic Places in Hettinger County, North Dakota
1887 establishments in Dakota Territory